This list comprises all players who have participated in at least one league match for Dayton Dutch Lions since the team's first season in the USL Premier Development League in 2010. Players who were on the roster but never played a first team game are not listed; players who appeared for the team in other competitions (US Open Cup, etc.) but never actually made a USL appearance are noted at the bottom of the page where appropriate.

A
  Jesjua Angoy-Cruyff

B
  Gibson Bardsley
  Fifi Baiden
  Steven Boehmer
  Taylor Bowlin
  Joe Broekhuizen

C
  Christian Camacho
  David Clemens
  Mettin Copier

D
  Jackson Beckham da Silva
  George Davis IV
  Joel DeLass
  Keith Detelj
  Geert den Ouden
  Randy Dennis
  Matheus Diovany

E
  Bas Ent

F
  Guilherme Félix
  Ryan Finley
  Ross Friedman

G
  Thomas Garner
  Kevan George
  Andrew Giallombardo
  Bruce Godvliet
  Brock Granger
  Matthew Griffin

H
  Happy Hall
  Shintaro Harada
  Eddie Hertsenberg

J
  Karamba Janneh
  Bret Jones

K
  Eric Kissinger
  Scott Krotee
  Irakli Khutsidze

L
  Kolby LaCrone
  Jesper Leerdam

M
  Luke Magill
  Steven McCarthy
  Judson McKinney
  Mikael McNamara
  Osman Mendez
  Oscar Moens

P
  Jeff Popella

S
  Aaron Schoenfeld
  Evan Schwartz
  Kyle Segebart
  Lucien Seymour
  Joel Silooy
  Shane Smith
  Yannick Smith
  Brad Stuver
  Benjamin Sweat

T
  Joe Tait
  Sean Teepen
  Sébastien Thurière

V
  Hans van de Haar
  Alex Van der Sluijs
  Marvin van der Pluijm
  Ivar van Dinteren
  Dick van Eijmeren
  Rick van Hoeven
  Cameron Vickers
  Brian Visser
  Kyle Vondenbenken

W
  Matt Walker
  Tjeerd Westdijk
  Matthew Wiet
  Johan Wigger
  Julius Wille
  Matt Williams

Sources

2010 Dayton Dutch Lions stats
Dayton Dutch Lions Alumni

References

Dayton Dutch Lions
 
Association football player non-biographical articles